Honours Easy is a 1935 British drama film directed by Herbert Brenon and starring Greta Nissen, Patric Knowles and Margaret Lockwood. It follows a man who tries to take revenge on a rival for a slight seventeen years before by framing his son for theft. It was based on the play Honours Easy by Roland Pertwee.

It was an early role for Margaret Lockwood.

Plot
Unhinged art dealer William Barton (Ivan Samson) seeks revenge on a man who ruined his career years ago. He does so by attempting to frame the man's son for the theft of $2,500 from the safe in his gallery. However the son has an alibi in Barton's wife, with whom he is having an affair.

Cast
 Greta Nissen as Ursula Barton
 Patric Knowles as Harry Markham
 Margaret Lockwood as Ann
 George Graves as Colonel Bagnall
 W. H. Berry as Joe Budd
 Chili Bouchier as Kate
 Robert Rendel as Sir Henry Markham
 Ivan Samson as William Barton

References

External links

Honours Easy at TCMDB

1935 films
1935 drama films
1930s English-language films
Films directed by Herbert Brenon
British drama films
British black-and-white films
1930s British films